The Howrah–Chennai main line is a railway line connecting Chennai and Kolkata cutting across Eastern Coastal Plains of India.

Sections
 Howrah–Kharagapur section (approximately 
 Kharagpur–Khurda Road section (approximately 
 Khurda Road–Visakhapatnam section (approximately ) 
 Nidadavole–Narsapuram section 
 Vijayawada–Gudur section (approximately ) South Coast Railway zone
 Gudur–Chennai section (approximately ) (except ) Southern Railway zone

Geography
The Howrah–Chennai main line traverses the Eastern Coastal Plains crossing such major rivers as the Mahanadi, Godavari and Krishna. The coastal plains lying between the Eastern Ghats and the Bay of Bengal are fertile agricultural lands with high density of population.

History
The Howrah–Delhi main line was the first trunk route in India connecting two metropolises. It was opened in 1866. The second trunk route was Howrah–Allahabad–Mumbai line, opened in 1870. The Howrah–Nagpur–Mumbai line was opened in 1900 as the third trunk route in the country. Close on its heels was the Howrah–Chennai main line in 1901.

Several other lines were also developed. 

Railway reorganization
The southern part of the East Coast State Railway (from Waltair to Vijayawada) was taken over by Madras Railway in 1901.

In 1908 Madras Railway was merged with the Southern Mahratta Railway to form Madras and Southern Mahratta Railway.

In the early 1950s legislation was passed authorizing the central government to take over independent railway systems that were there. On 14 April 1951 the Madras and Southern Mahratta Railway, the South Indian Railway Company and Mysore State Railway were merged to form Southern Railway. Subsequently, Nizam's Guaranteed State Railway was also merged into Southern Railway. On 2 October 1966, the Secunderabad, Solapur, Hubli and Vijayawada Divisions, covering the former territories of Nizam's Guaranteed State Railway and certain portions of Madras and Southern Mahratta Railway were separated from Southern Railway to form the South Central Railway. In 1977, Guntakal division of Southern Railway was transferred to South Central Railway and the Solapur division transferred to Central Railway. Amongst the seven new zones created in 2010 was South Western Railway, which was carved out of Southern Railway.

The Bengal Nagpur Railway was nationalized in 1944.Eastern Railway was formed on 14 April 1952 with the portion of East Indian Railway Company east of Mughalsarai and the Bengal Nagpur Railway. In 1955, South Eastern Railway was carved out of Eastern Railway. It comprised lines mostly operated by BNR earlier. Amongst the new zones started in April 2003 were East Coast Railway  and South East Central Railway. Both these railways were carved out of South Eastern Railway. Amongst the new zone to be started in April 2020 is South Coast Railway this railway was carved out of South Central Railway and East Coast Railway.

Electrification
Howrah–Chennai Mail was the first train in South Eastern Railway to be hauled by a diesel engine (WDM-1) in 1965.

The Howrah–Chennai route was completely electrified by 2005.

Speed limits
The New Delhi–Chennai Central line (Grand Trunk route), of which the Vijayawada–Chennai section is a part, and Howrah–Nagpur–Mumbai line, of which the Howrah–Kharagpur section is a part, are classified as "Group A" lines which can take speeds up to 160 km/h. The Kharagpur-Vijayawada sector is classified as a Group B line which can take speeds up to 130 km/h.

Passenger movement
The main passenger train services along this line are the Howrah–Chennai Mail and the Coromandel Express. Howrah, Kharagpur, Balasore, Cuttack, Bhubaneswar, Brahmapur, Vizianagaram, Visakhapatnam, Rajahmundry, Eluru, Vijayawada, Nellore, Gudur and Chennai Central on this line are amongst the top hundred booking stations of Indian Railway.

Golden quadrilateral
The Howrah–Chennai main line is a part of the golden quadrilateral. The routes connecting the four major metropolises (New Delhi, Mumbai, Chennai and Kolkata), along with their diagonals, known as the golden quadrilateral, carry about half the freight and nearly half the passenger traffic, although they form only 16 per cent of the length.

References

5 ft 6 in gauge railways in India
Rail transport in West Bengal
Rail transport in Odisha
Rail transport in Andhra Pradesh
Rail transport in Tamil Nadu